St. Pius X Minor Seminary is the preparatory seminary in the Archdiocese of Karachi. It is located in North Nazimabad, Sindh, Pakistan.

It had 21 seminarians in April 2008. Father Benjamin Shehzad was the seminary's rector from 2005 to 2012. In 2012 he was appointed Rector of Christ for the King major seminary.

The seminary is one of four minor seminaries educating 92 seminarians in Faisalabad, Lahore, Karachi and Rawalpindi. Major seminary studies are split between St. Francis Xavier Seminary in Lahore, where 41 seminarians are studying philosophy, and Christ the King Seminary in Karachi, where 23 seminarians who have finished their study of philosophy are studying theology.

Expansion 
Due to congestion and other issues, a larger seminary building was constructed on ground adjacent to St. Jude's Church in Karachi. Construction of the seminary began in October 2008, with completion targeted for October 2009.

In May 2011, Archbishop Evarist Pinto cut the ribbon and opened the much-needed newly constructed seminary. The archdiocese faced a vocation crisis for three decades as many applicants had to be turned away due to lack of space. The 12 minor seminarians have to move into the new block very soon. Spanning 6,070 square meters, the facility can accommodate more than 50 candidates and has a chapel, library and computer room. In 2010 the seminary received financial assistance for the construction of its new facilities from the Curé of Ars Parish in Leawood, Kansas, USA.

In 2011, 88 minor and 94 major seminarians filled the four minor and two major seminaries in the country.

In June 2019 ten young men joined the Seminary taking the total number of students to 30.

History 
St. Pius X Minor Seminary opened in 1958 in Quetta (later becoming the Apostolic Prefecture of Quetta) in Baluchistan Province. It was shifted to Catholic Colony in Karachi in 1973.

In August 2011 St Pius became the first seminary in the country to provide internet access to its students.

Rectors
Fr. Joseph Cordeiro – 1952 - 1958
Fr. Francis de Souza – 1958 – 1965
Fr. Luperc Mascarenhas – 1965 - 1990
Fr. James deSouza – 1990 – 1994
Fr. Joseph D'Mello – 1994 - 2001
Fr. Augustine Soares – 2001 - 2005
Fr. Benjamin Shahzad – 2005 - 2012
Fr. Benny Travas - 2012 - 2014
Fr. Ryan Joseph - 2014 -2021
Fr. Shahzad Arshad - 2021 -

References

Catholic seminaries in Pakistan
Catholic minor seminaries
1958 establishments in Pakistan
Educational institutions established in 1958